Santa Rosa is a municipality in the Brazilian state of Rio Grande do Sul, located at latitude 27º52'15" and longitude 54º28'53" at a height of 277 meters above sea level. It has an area of 488.42 km2. Its estimated population is 73,575 (2020). It is known as the "National Cradle of Soybeans".

History
Santa Rosa was created as a colony of European immigrants in 1915, mainly Italians, Germans and Russians. The German dialect traditionally spoken in the region is Riograndenser Hunsrückisch.

Notable residents
The city is the birthplace of the popular Brazilian celebrity Maria da Graça Meneghel known as Xuxa and Brazilian World Cup Winning Goalkeeper Cláudio Taffarel.

Transportation
The city is served by Luís Alberto Lehr Airport.

Events
Soybean National Fair (Fenasoja)
South American Nativist Music Festival (Musicanto)
State Meeting of horticulture (Hortigranjeiros)
Dance in Santa Rosa Festival
Festival of Ethnic Groups
Piggy in Roller Feast
 Cruzeiro Neighborhood Community Fair (EXPOCruzeiro)
Oktoberfest
Student Song Festival (Canto Livre)
Santa Rosa Shows Gramado

Student Movement
The Santa Rosense Union of Secondary Students (USES) exists since 1959, is the entity formed by high school and representing students from all elementary schools, secondary, technical, vocational and college preparatory school in Santa Rosa. Is USES who meets the student unions of public and private schools, in addition to state and local entities in the fight for a quality education, representing and defending the national rights of youth.

References

External links
Santa Rosa city hall page (Portuguese)
Santa Rosa detailed Street Map
Jornal Noroeste - news from the city and region

 
Municipalities in Rio Grande do Sul